The Voice Kids is a British television music competition to find new singing talent. The second series began airing on 14 July 2018, being broadcast on a daily basis on ITV. It is hosted by Emma Willis and the coaches are will.i.am, Pixie Lott and Danny Jones. Daniel Davies won the competition and Pixie Lott was the winning coach for the second year in a row.

Teams

Colour key:
  Winner
  Finalist
  Eliminated in the Semi-final
  Eliminated in the Battles

Blind auditions
Colour key

Episode 1 (14 July)

Episode 2 (15 July)

Episode 3 (16 July)

Episode 4 (17 July)

Battle rounds

Colour key

Episode 1 (18 July)

Episode 2 (19 July)

Show details

Results summary
Team's colour key
 Team Will
 Team Pixie
 Team Danny

Result's colour key
 Artist received the most public votes
 Artist was eliminated 
 Finalist

Semi-final (20 July)

Live final (21 July)

 Group performances: The Final 6 with coaches ("Mr. Blue Sky")
Musical guests: Donel Mangena ("Bang Like a Drum") and Kylie Minogue ("Golden")

References

External links 

The Voice UK
2018 British television seasons